Stena Line is a Swedish shipping line company and one of the largest ferry operators in the world. It services Denmark, France, Germany, the United Kingdom, Ireland, Latvia, the Netherlands, Norway, Poland and Sweden. Stena Line is a major unit of Stena AB, itself a part of the Stena Sphere.

History

Formation

Stena Line was founded in 1962 by Sten A. Olsson in Gothenburg, Sweden, which still serves as the company's headquarters, when he acquired Skagenlinjen between Gothenburg and Frederikshavn, Denmark.

In 1972, Stena Line was one of the first ferry operators in Europe to introduce a computer-based reservation system for the travel business area. In 1978, the freight business area also started operating a computer-based reservation system.

Freight

The first freight-focused route started between Gothenburg, Sweden, and Kiel, Germany. The ship was the MS Stena Transporter.

North Sea

During the 1980s, Stena acquired three other ferry companies.

 1981, Sessan Line, Stena's biggest competitor on Sweden–Denmark routes, was acquired and incorporated into Stena Line.
 1983, Stena acquired Varberg-Grenå Linjen, and two years later also the right to that company's former name, Lion Ferry. Lion Ferry continued as a separate marketing company until 1997, when it was incorporated into Stena Line. 
 1989, Stena acquired yet another ferry company, Stoomvaart Maatschappij Zeeland (SMZ) (which at the time traded under the name Crown Line). SMZ's Hook of Holland–Harwich route then became a part of Stena Line.

North America

 1988, Jul - Stena Line purchased the British Columbia Steamship Co., operators of a Victoria–Seattle route.
 1990, Nov - The Victoria–Seattle run was permanently cancelled, and the local company ceased trading.

Irish Sea

In 1990 Stena Line doubled in size with the acquisition of Sealink British Ferries from Sea Containers. This first became Sealink Stena Line, then Stena Sealink Line and finally Stena Line (UK), which now operates all of Stena's ferry services between Great Britain and Ireland.

In 1996, Stena Line introduced its 20,000 tonne HSS (High-speed Sea Service) vessels, which operated: Belfast-Stranraer; Holyhead-Dún Laoghaire and Hook of Holland-Harwich. In addition to the three 1,500-passenger HSS vessels, Stena Line ordered two smaller 900-passenger HSS vessels to operate on the Gothenburg–Frederikshavn route. Due to the bankruptcy of the shipyard, only the first of these vessels was ever completed.

English channel

In 1998, Stena's operations from Dover and Newhaven were merged with P&O European Ferries to form P&O Stena Line, 40% of which was owned by Stena and 60% by P&O. In 2002, P&O acquired all of Stena's shares in the company, thus becoming the sole owner of P&O Stena Line, which soon changed its name to P&O Ferries.

Further expansion

In 2000, Stena Line purchased yet another Scandinavian ferry operator: Scandlines AB.

In November 2006, Stena ordered a pair of "super ferries" with a gross tonnage of 62,000 from Aker Yards, Germany for delivery in 2010, with an option for two more ships of the same design. The new ferries will be amongst the largest in the world, to be operated on Stena's North Sea route from Hook of Holland to Harwich. The existing ships from the North Sea were to be moved to the Kiel–Gothenborg route, whereas the ships from Kiel would transfer to the Gdynia to Karlskrona route. The new ferries were launched in 2010, with Stena Hollandica entering service on 16 May 2010, and Stena Britannica planned to enter service in the autumn of 2010.

Acquisitions and closures
 2008, May - The company moved its Belfast Terminal from Albert Quay to the new VT4. This has reduced the length of the crossing to Stranraer by ten minutes.
 2009, Jul - Stena Line announced that it had repurchased its former ship, Stena Parisien, from SeaFrance. The ship is now known as Stena Navigator. She had a  comprehensive refit. Following on from this, the ship was introduced on the Stranraer to Belfast route, alongside HSS Stena Voyager and Stena Caledonia.
 2010, Dec -  Stena Line announced it had acquired the Northern Irish operations of DFDS Seaways. The sale includes the Belfast to Heysham & Birkenhead routes, two vessels from the Heysham route (Scotia Seaways & Hibernia Seaways) and two chartered vessels from the Birkenhead route ( & ). The Fleetwood to Larne route ended on 24 December 2010.
 2011, Nov 21 - Stena Line introduced the Stena Superfast VII and Stena Superfast VIII to replace the Stena Navigator and Stena Caledonia on the Belfast-Cairnryan route. It was announced that the Stena Voyager would be removed from service on 20 November 2011. It was later sold to Stena Recycling and sent for scrapping in May 2013.
 2014, Feb 26 - it was announced that Stena Line would acquire the Celtic Link ferry service from Rosslare to Cherbourg, France.
 2019 Feb - A joint venture with Hyundai Glovis has been announced and approved by the European Commission, for the implementation of a new cooperative short sea intra-European waters service in between the two carriers, for the sea transport of transhipment cargo originating from South Korea.
 2020, Mar 14 - due to the Coronavirus outbreak, the company suspended operations between Oslo and Frederikshavn temporarily until further notice due to travel restrictions in Denmark and Norway, the routes sole ship the MS Stena Saga was sent to Gothenburg where she arrived on 16 March 2020 where the company later confirmed it would be making 950 redundancies in Sweden as a result of Coronavirus. The company then later announced on 19 March 2020 that it was going to permanently suspend and close operations on the Oslo-Frederikshavn service due to the lack of profitability, where Stena announced that due to Coronavirus it was unlikely able to see it turn a profit during the whole year when the service is totally dependent on the summer season. The future of Stena Saga remains uncertain and remained laid up in Gothenburg.

Routes

Irish Sea 
 Fishguard – Rosslare: 
 Holyhead – Dublin Port: Stena Adventurer, Stena Estrid

 Belfast – Cairnryan: Stena Superfast VII, Stena Superfast VIII, Stena Nordica
 Belfast – Heysham: Stena Hibernia, Stena Scotia
 Belfast – Birkenhead: Stena Edda, Stena Embla, Stena Foreteller
 Cherbourg – Rosslare: Stena Horizon (currently delayed in dry-dock), Panorama Seatruck, Stena Forecaster.

North Sea 
 Hook of Holland – Harwich: Stena Britannica, Stena Hollandica
 Hook of Holland – North Killingholme Haven: Stena Transit, Stena Transporter
 Rotterdam – Harwich: Somerset, Stena Forerunnner
 Rotterdam – North Killingholme Haven: POL Maris, Hatche/POL Stella
 Rotterdam – Immingham (from 2022): Jutlandia Sea, Fiona Sea

Baltic Sea 
 Halmstad – Grenå: 
 Gothenburg – Kiel: Stena Germanica, Stena Scandinavica
 Oslo – Fredrikshavn:  - Closed 19 March 2020
 Karlskrona – Gdynia: Stena Spirit, Stena Vision, Stena Nordica
 Nynäshamn – Ventspils: Stena Scandica, Stena Baltica (from February 2022), Stena Flavia (until February 2022)
 Trelleborg – Rostock: Mecklenburg Vorpommern, 
 Nynäshamn - Hanko: Urd, Stena Gothica (from 1 May 2022)
 Travemünde – Liepāja: Stena Gothica, Stena Livia,  Stena Flavia (from February 2022)

Fleet

Current ships

Future fleet 
Stena has five vessels of the E-Flexer class on order, with the first scheduled for delivery in early 2020.
The first ship of the new series was named Stena Estrid. After her trials, she has commenced service on 13 January 2020, on the route Dublin - Holyhead.

Gallery

See also 
 Stena Line Holland BV
 P&O Stena Line
 Hyundai Glovis

References

Notes

Bibliography

External links 

 Stena Line – Corporate site
 Stena Line Reservations – UK online ticket reservations and home pages
 Stena Line Reservations – Swedish online ticket reservations and home pages
 Stena Line Reservations – Czech online ticket reservations and home pages
 Stena Line Reservations – Dutch online ticket reservations and home pages

 
Ferry companies of Sweden
Ferry companies of England
Ferry companies of Scotland
Ferry companies of Wales
Ferry companies of Northern Ireland
Ferry companies of the Republic of Ireland
Ferry companies of the Netherlands
Ferry companies of Denmark
Ferry companies of Germany
Ferry companies of Norway
Ferry companies of Poland
Companies based in Gothenburg
1962 establishments in Sweden
Transport companies established in 1962
Multinational companies headquartered in Sweden
Swedish brands
Ro-ro shipping companies
Car carrier shipping companies